Serah  is a South Indian actress. She was introduced to the film industry through a Malayalam film Samastha Keralam PO opposite Jayaram and Directed by Bipin Prabhakar. She was a model prior to entering the movie industry. She is settled in Ireland.

Acting career

Serah enters into the Malayalam film industry with 'Samastha Keralam P.O (2009) with Jayaram in the lead. She is now all set to venture into other South Indian languages.

Her hobbies include watching movies, travelling and "shopping".

Filmography

Malayalam Films
 Samastha Keralam PO (2009)
 De Ingottu Nokkiye (2008)

Television
Madhavi (2009-2011)

References
1.http://www.indiancinemagallery.com/Gallery2/v/South/Movies/Malayalam/Samastha+Keralam+PO/
2.http://www.nowrunning.com/movie/6116/malayalam/samastha-keralam-p-o/gallery.htm
3.http://malayalamgallery.oneindia.in/v/malayalam-movies/samastha-keralam-po/samastha-keralam-po-04.jpg.html
4.http://www.serahs.net

Living people
Actresses in Malayalam cinema
Indian film actresses
Female models from Kerala
Year of birth missing (living people)
Actresses in Tamil television